This is a list of people who have served as Custos Rotulorum of Cheshire.

 Richard Sampson, Bishop of Coventry and Lichfield bef. 1544–1547
 Sir Thomas Holcroft 1548–1558
 Richard Harpour 1558–?
 William Gerard bef. 1564 – bef. 1573
 Sir Edward Fitton bef. 1573–1579
 Sir Hugh Cholmondeley (the elder) 1579–1597
 Sir Hugh Cholmondeley (the younger) 1597–1601
 Sir John Egerton 1601–1614
 Sir George Booth, 1st Baronet 1621–1644
 Sir Orlando Bridgeman 1644–1646?
 Interregnum
 Sir George Booth, 2nd Baronet 1660–1673
 Lord Henry Booth 1673–1682
 William Stanley, 9th Earl of Derby 1682–1688
 William Herbert, 1st Marquess of Powis 1688–1689
 Henry Booth, 2nd Baron Delamere 1689–1694
For later custodes rotulorum, see Lord Lieutenant of Cheshire.

References
Institute of Historical Research - Custodes Rotulorum 1544-1646
Institute of Historical Research - Custodes Rotulorum 1660-1828

Cheshire
Local government in Cheshire